Oppomorus funiculatus is a species of sea snail, a marine gastropod mollusk, in the family Muricidae, the murex snails or rock snails.

Distribution
It can be found in Hawaii on Oahu Island, Pupukea Beach Park, and near Near Waimea Bay.

References

External links
 Reeve, L. A. (1846). Monograph of the genus Ricinula. In: Conchologia Iconica, or, illustrations of the shells of molluscous animals, vol. 3, pl. 1-6 and unpaginated text. L. Reeve & Co., London.
 Claremont, M.; Houart, R.; Williams, S. T. & Reid, D. G. (2013). A molecular phylogenetic framework for the Ergalataxinae (Neogastropoda: Muricidae). Journal of Molluscan Studies. 79 (1): 19-29.

funiculatus
Gastropods described in 1846